Saint-Mathias/Grant Aerodrome  is located  southeast of Saint-Mathias-sur-Richelieu, Quebec, Canada.

See also
 List of airports in the Montreal area

References

Registered aerodromes in Montérégie
Rouville Regional County Municipality